The Orton Plantation is a historic plantation house in the Smithville Township of Brunswick County, North Carolina, United States. Located beside the Cape Fear River between Wilmington and Southport, Orton Plantation is considered to be a near-perfect example of Southern antebellum architecture. Built in 1735 by the co-founder of Brunswick Town, the Orton Plantation house is one of the oldest structures in Brunswick County. During its history Orton Plantation has been attacked by Native Americans, used as a military hospital, and been home to lawyers, physicians, military leaders, and a Colonial governor. Although the home is privately owned and closed to the public, the Orton Plantation Gardens and family-owned chapel have become a tourist destination in Southeastern North Carolina, attracting thousands of visitors each year. On April 11, 1973, the Orton Plantation was added to the National Register of Historic Places.

History

In 1725, Roger Moore, son of Governor James Moore and grandson of Irish nobleman Sir Rory Moore, and his family moved from the Province of South Carolina to an area of land known as Orton in southeastern North Carolina. Orton was owned by Roger's brother, Colonel Maurice Moore, father of General James Moore and Maurice Moore, Jr., author of a famous essay denouncing the Stamp Act of 1765.  The elder Maurice was also the grandfather of Supreme Court Associate Justice Alfred Moore. Maurice sold the land to his brother when Roger moved to the area and together they founded Brunswick Town one mile (1.6 km) south of Orton.

The first home Roger built in 1725 was destroyed by local Native Americans. Roger constructed the current Orton Plantation home in 1735 and developed his land into a leading rice plantation with the unpaid labor of hundreds of slaves. Orton remained in the Moore family until it was purchased by Benjamin Smith, who eventually lost ownership and was forced to auction off the home and surrounding . The property was purchased by a physician, Frederick Jones Hill, in 1826. According to a reward advertisement for runaway slaves in the June 17, 1861 edition of the Fayetteville Semi-Weekly Observer (Fayeteville, North Carolina), the plantation was owned by Thomas C. Miller during 1861. He had apparently purchased the plantation and the slaves thereon from Dr. Hill. Following the Confederate defeat at Fort Fisher, Union soldiers confiscated Orton Plantation and used the home as a military hospital, thus sparing it from destruction. Orton Plantation was abandoned after the War and the house sat empty for 19 years.

In 1884, Orton Plantation was purchased by a former Confederate military officer, Kenneth MacKenzie Murchison. Murchison restored the plantation to its original appearance and made it his winter home. When Murchison died in 1904, Orton Plantation was purchased by his son-in-law and daughter, James and Luola Sprunt. James, a lawyer, encouraged his wife to remodel the home and in 1910 he and Luola began the development of a flower garden and expansion of the house. The Sprunts constructed a family chapel in 1915, and when his wife died the following year from scarlet fever, James renamed the building to Luola's Chapel in her honor. At approximately the same time their son, James Laurence Sprunt tragically lost his first wife, Amoret Cameron Price giving birth to their first son, James Laurence Sprunt Jr.

After a relative was involved in an automobile accident, the Sprunts opened their garden to the public in hopes of raising money for medical expenses. Charging 25 cents for an entrance fee, the family raised $1,000 in a week. From that point on, the Sprunts decided to keep the garden open to the public. In 1954, the Sprunt family donated  of the Orton Plantation to establish the Brunswick Town State Historic Site. Four years later, James Laurence Sprunt wrote a book about the history of Orton Plantation entitled The Story of Orton Plantation. After the death of Laurence Sprunt in 1973 and Annie Gray Sprunt in 1978, the ownership was shared by their four sons: James Laurence Sprunt Jr., Kenneth Murchison, Samuel Nash, and Laurence Gray Sprunt. Kenneth succeeded Bragaw as manager of the gardens after World War II until 2006 when Laurence bought the gardens from his brothers and continued the management. Ownership of the Orton Plantation was passed down to each generation of the Sprunt family for 126 years.

The Laurence Sprunt family sold Orton Plantation for $45 million in May 2010 to Louis Moore Bacon, a hedge fund manager and direct descendant of Roger Moore, builder of the original Orton home in 1725. Bacon plans to restore the house and renovate the grounds.

The Orton Plantation used to be a tourist attraction with the gardens and chapel open to the public. The old rice fields are now a wildlife sanctuary and the plantation was a haven for birdwatchers. Weddings, family reunions, corporate events, and school fieldtrips took place at the property and the gift shop and ticket office were located in Sunnyside, a playhouse built in the 1890s for James and Luola's daughter, Marion. Sunnyside was moved to the Orton Plantation in 1939. Bacon closed the plantation in 2010 and is spending a "significant amount" on restoration and research. 4000 acres of forest were burned in 2012 as part of the project. Bacon wants to grow rice on the land by 2014 for the first time since 1931. Because the fields are wetlands this requires a permit from the United States Army Corps of Engineers. Bacon also wants the National Registry designation to include the rice fields, and for the plantation to become a National Historic Landmark.

Architecture

The Orton Plantation house is an example of Classical Revival and Greek Revival architecture. Originally a -story white brick building, a second floor was added to the house in 1840 along with four fluted Doric columns. Two wings were added to the house in 1904. A corbelled brick chimney is located on each side of the original section of the home.

Similar to the house, Luola's Chapel is a white brick structure with four Doric columns. The chapel is surrounded by gardens and features a small steeple. A pavilion is located near the chapel.

The garden features tree-lined brick paths and rows of camellias, dogwoods, magnolias, crape-myrtles, annuals, and perennials. The front gates of the property are topped with cement eagles which lead to a dirt path driveway lined with large oak trees draped in Spanish moss that were planted in the 18th century.

Popular culture

In 1983, American movie producer Frank Capra, Jr. searched for a location to film a scene for his movie Firestarter and chose Orton Plantation. Afterwards, Capra Jr. convinced movie producer Dino De Laurentiis to open a studio in nearby Wilmington. Laurentiis founded the De Laurentiis Entertainment Group which brought additional opportunities for movie and television filming at the Orton Plantation.

Since 1983, Orton Plantation has been featured in 23 films and 34 television movies and series. Some of the movies that feature scenes from Orton Plantation include Lolita, Divine Secrets of the Ya-Ya Sisterhood, Hounddog, and A Walk to Remember. Television series that have filmed scenes at Orton Plantation include One Tree Hill, Dawson's Creek, Hart of Dixie and Matlock.

See also
 List of plantations
 National Register of Historic Places listings in North Carolina
 List of the oldest buildings in North Carolina

References

Further reading
 Orton Plantation, by H. Lacy Hunt, Jr., Doubleday, Page & Company, 1937, 
 Orton Plantation, by The North Carolina Society of the Colonial Dames of America, 1938, 
 The Story of Orton Plantation, by James Laurence Sprunt, Orton Plantation, 1958,

External links

 Orton Plantation website

Antebellum architecture
Houses completed in 1735
American Civil War hospitals
Botanical gardens in North Carolina
Chapels in the United States
Neoclassical architecture in North Carolina
Greek Revival houses in North Carolina
Historic house museums in North Carolina
Open-air museums in North Carolina
Houses on the National Register of Historic Places in North Carolina
Museums in Brunswick County, North Carolina
Plantation houses in North Carolina
National Register of Historic Places in Brunswick County, North Carolina
O'Moore family